Capital Clube de Futebol, known in English as Capital CF, is a Brazilian football club based in Paranoá, Distrito Federal. The club was formerly known as Sociedade Esportiva Maringá and Capital/Cristalina.

History
The club was founded on July 5, 2005  as Sociedade Esportiva Maringá. They won the Campeonato Brasiliense Second Level in 2005, after they defeated Ceilandense in the final. Capital won the Campeonato Brasiliense Third Level in 2009, after they defeated Bosque Formosa in the final. Capital joined a partnership with Goiás state club Cristalina Futebol Clube in August 2011, and adopted the name Capital/Cristalina. They changed the name back to Capital CF in the end of the year.

Between 2017 and 2019, the team had a partnership with Clube Desportivo Futebol Universidade de Brasília and used the name Capital/UNB.

Achievements

 Campeonato Brasiliense Second Level:
 Winners (1): 2005
 Campeonato Brasiliense Third Level:
 Winners (1): 2009

Stadium

Capital Clube de Futebol play their home games at Estádio Nacional de Brasília, commonly known as Estádio Mané Garrincha. The stadium has a maximum capacity of 72,200 people. The stadium has a maximum capacity of 1,000 people.

External links
Capital CF official site

References

Association football clubs established in 2005
Football clubs in Federal District (Brazil)
2005 establishments in Brazil